The Conservative Party of Canada elects its leaders through a process known as a leadership election. The most recent leadership election was held in 2022.

Since 2004, the party has elected its leaders on a one member, one vote basis using a ranked ballot. The process is weighted so that each riding is allocated 100 points, divided proportionately among candidates based on their percentage of the vote in that riding. This process was first used in the 1998 Progressive Conservative leadership election, a predecessor party of the modern Conservative Party.

2004 leadership election

Held in Toronto, Ontario on March 20, 2004.

2017 leadership election

Held in Toronto, Ontario on May 27, 2017.

2020 leadership election

Conducted by mail-in ballot due August 21, with results announced on August 23-24.

2022 leadership election

Following the ousting of previous leader Erin O’Toole, a leadership election to choose his successor was held.

On September 10, 2022, the Conservative Party announced that Pierre Poilievre had won the election in the first round with 68% of points.

Poilievre won the leadership election in a landslide, carrying 330 of 338 ridings with at least a plurality. The only other candidate to win a plurality in any ridings was Jean Charest, whose support mostly came from Quebec, though Poilievre still won 72 of the province's 78 ridings. Charest won his former federal riding of Sherbrooke, all other candidates losing their ridings to Poilievre.

See also
Progressive Conservative Party of Canada leadership elections
Canadian Alliance leadership elections

References